Álvaro Salto Johansson (born 11 January 1974) is a Spanish professional golfer who plays on the Challenge Tour.

Salto represented Spain in the Eisenhower Trophy in 1996 with Sergio García, José Manuel Lara and Ivo Giner. He turned professional the following year.

Salto joined the Challenge Tour in 1998 and won the Eulen Open Galea in his rookie season. He picked up his second win on Tour in 2000 at the Credit Suisse Private Banking Open. In 2001 he went through qualifying school to earn his European Tour card for 2002. He struggled in his rookie season but earned his Tour card for 2003 through qualifying school. He returned to the Challenge Tour in 2004 and remained on Tour until 2008. He picked up his third win on Tour in 2006 at the Parco di Monza Challenge. Since 2008 he has been playing on Tour part-time.

Professional wins (4)

Challenge Tour wins (3)

Challenge Tour playoff record (0–1)

Alps Tour wins (1)

Spanish national team appearances
Eisenhower Trophy: 1996

External links

Spanish male golfers
European Tour golfers
Sportspeople from Málaga
1974 births
Living people
20th-century Spanish people
21st-century Spanish people